Samuel Brudenell Fludyer (1759–1833) was an English politician. He inherited great wealth from his father, the first baronet, and social position from his mother Caroline Brudenell, the niece of the 3rd earl of Cardigan. He became a Member of Parliament, but there is no record of his having spoken in the house.

Early life
Samuel Brudenell Fludyer was born 8 October 1759, the first son of Samuel Fludyer and his second wife. He was educated at Westminster School from 1771 and went on the Grand Tour. He inherited the baronetcy in his minority, 18 January 1768 and was returned to Parliament for Aldeburgh when a vacancy occurred in May 1781. When Parliament was dissolved in 1784 he was not re-elected.

He was commissioned as an Ensign in the Monmouthshire Militia on 25 June 1781, and was promoted to Captain in the combined Monmouth and Brecon Militia on 25 March 1799, rising to Lieutenant-Colonel on 1 July 1805. He resigned on 24 August 1812.

Marriage and children
On 5 October 1786, Fludyer married his first cousin Maria, the daughter of Robert Weston and Louisa, daughter of James Brudenell. They had four children, Samuel Fludyer, 3rd Baronet and three daughters, Maria and Caroline-Louise, and Charlotte who died young.

Death
On 17 February 1833 he died in Felixstowe, Suffolk. Apart from lending his name to the Fludyer Arms, a hotel in Felixstowe, he seems to have no lasting achievements.

References

Members of the Parliament of Great Britain for English constituencies
Baronets in the Baronetage of Great Britain
1759 births
1833 deaths
British MPs 1780–1784
Brecknockshire Militia officers